St. Elizabeth of Hungary is a historic Roman Catholic church complex located within the Archdiocese of Baltimore in the Baltimore-Linwood neighborhood of Baltimore, Maryland, United States.

Description
The complex developed over the period 1895–1926, and consists of four buildings: a two-story, gable-fronted brick structure erected in 1895 as the original church, parish hall, and rectory; a large stone Romanesque church building constructed in 1912; a three-story convent built in 1922; and a large three-story parochial school which was added to the site in 1926. The complex occupies a city block directly opposite Patterson Park. In 1931, the St. Elizabeth School had the largest student enrollment, 1,500 students, in the archdiocese. The church was founded to serve the German immigrant community in Baltimore.

St. Elizabeth of Hungary was listed on the National Register of Historic Places in 1994.

References

External links

, including photo from 1994, at Maryland Historical Trust
Roman Catholic Archdiocese of Baltimore

Roman Catholic churches completed in 1895
Patterson Park (neighborhood), Baltimore
German-American culture in Baltimore
Roman Catholic churches in Baltimore
Properties of religious function on the National Register of Historic Places in Baltimore
Romanesque Revival architecture in Maryland
19th-century Roman Catholic church buildings in the United States
Churches on the National Register of Historic Places in Maryland